China Airlines Flight 605 (callsign "Dynasty 605") was a daily non-stop flight departing from Taipei at 6:30 a.m. and arriving at Kai Tak Airport in Hong Kong at 7:00 a.m. local time. On November 4, 1993, the plane went off the runway while landing during a storm. It was the first hull loss of a Boeing 747-400.

Aircraft and crew 
The aircraft involved was a almost-new Boeing 747-400 registered as B-165. It was only five months old at the time of the accident, having been built in June 1993. The aircraft was powered by four Pratt & Whitney PW4056 turbofan engines and had only 1,969 flight hours with 359 takeoff and landing cycles at the time of the accident.

The 47-year-old captain had previously served with the Republic of China Air Force and joined China Airlines in 1984. He started flying the 747 (the older -200 variant) in 1988 and was upgraded to a captain of the 747-400 in 1990. At the time of the accident, the captain had logged a total of 12,469 flight hours, including 3,559 hours on the Boeing 747. The 37-year-old first officer joined the airline in 1992, having previously served with the Republic of China Army. He had 5,705 hours, though only 953 of them were on the Boeing 747.

Accident 

The pilots received several computer-generated wind shear and glide slope deviation warnings, and observed severe airspeed fluctuations, during the last mile before touchdown. The captain, who was the pilot flying, disconnected the auto-pilot and began flying the plane manually. He also disconnected the auto-throttle as he was dissatisfied with its performance. After the aircraft landed, the First Officer took control of the plane and attempted to keep the aircraft on the centerline. However, his inputs were too severe and the Captain was forced to aid him. Meanwhile, the Captain inadvertently increased engine power rather than activating the thrust reversers. The auto brakes were set at only the number two level and then were turned off seconds after touchdown due to the increase in power. The speedbrakes were extended briefly, but then retracted, also due to the power increase. This caused the plane to "float", making the brakes ineffective until the speed brakes were extended again. When the First Officer finally noticed that the auto-brakes were disarmed and the thrust reversers had not deployed, the captain immediately applied manual braking and thrust reversal.  

The captain deliberately turned the plane to the left when he realized the plane would overrun the runway and hit the approach lighting system (ALS) for runway 31. That action caused a "ground loop", making the plane slide off the left side of the runway into Victoria Harbour. The plane came to rest in shallow water, with a heading of almost 180 degrees out from the direction of runway 13.

A British Airways pilot had refused to make the approach to Kai Tak runway 13 minutes before the CAL 605 captain decided to attempt it.

The investigation indicated that the accident was caused by the captain's failure to initiate the mandatory missed approach procedure when he observed the severe airspeed fluctuations, combined with the wind shear and glide slope deviation alerts. The first officer was also found to not have enough experience to handle the aircraft while landing in crosswind conditions. China Airlines was also criticized for not having a clear crosswind landing procedure in their manuals to aid pilots. The investigation recommended that the airline revise its manuals and flight training.

Aftermath 

Immediately after the aircraft came to rest in the water, crew members ensured that all passengers donned life jackets and evacuated onto eight of the ten main deck emergency exits. These exits (as on all 747s) are equipped with inflatable evacuation slide/rafts for ditching emergencies. The passenger cabin remained completely above water during the evacuation, although eventually sinking tail-first. Additional damage to the nose and first-class cabin was noted. There were 23 minor injuries among passengers and crew. 

The plane was written off as a total hull loss. Since the plane's vertical stabilizer interfered with the accuracy of the instrument landing system signals for runway 31 – which allowed aircraft to make safe ILS approaches whenever the wind patterns mandated the use of runway 31 (the reciprocal direction of runway 13) – the vertical stabilizer was removed with dynamite shortly after the crash. The China Airlines lettering and the Chinese characters were removed, as was part of the livery on the fuselage, to conceal the identity of the aircraft as belonging to China Airlines. After the accident, the aircraft was stored near the HAECO building for use in firefighting practice.

China Airlines still continued to use the flight number 605 on its Taipei-Hong Kong routes until 2015. As of November 2021, the flight numbers serving the said route are 903, 641, 909, 915, 919, 923, 921 and 601, flown on a mixed fleet of Boeing 747, Airbus A330, Airbus A350, and Boeing 737 aircraft, and currently operates out of Chek Lap Kok airport.

See also 
TAM Airlines Flight 3054
Air France Flight 358
American Airlines Flight 1420
American Airlines Flight 331
Lion Air Flight 538
Lion Air Flight 904
Southwest Airlines Flight 1248

References

External links 
 
 Aircraft Accident Report 1/95 Report on the accident to Boeing 747-409B B-165 at Hong Kong International Airport on 4 November 1993 (Archive) - Civil Aviation Department (Hong Kong)
 Transcript of the CAL605 Cockpit Voice Recorder (CVR) — includes brief overview, 3m24s of cockpit dialog prior to "splash," photo of aircraft in final position.

Aviation accidents and incidents in Hong Kong
Aviation accidents and incidents in 1993
Airliner accidents and incidents caused by weather
Airliner accidents and incidents caused by pilot error
Aviation accidents and incidents involving runway excursions
Accidents and incidents involving the Boeing 747
605
1993 meteorology
1993 in Hong Kong
1993 in Taiwan
November 1993 events in Asia